Bright Like Neon Love is the debut studio album by Australian electronic music band Cut Copy, released by Modular Recordings in Australia on 5 April 2004 and in the United States on 18 May 2004. The album was released on vinyl for the first time on 20 April 2013 for Record Store Day, in a limited run of 4000 copies.

Critical reception

Bright Like Neon Love received widespread acclaim from critics. At Metacritic, which assigns a normalised rating out of 100 to reviews from mainstream publications, the album received an average score of 81, based on nine reviews. NME compared the album to "Technique-era New Order fed through My Bloody Valentine's distortion pedals" and described it as "the album Daft Punk should have made". In his highly positive review for Drowned in Sound, Euan McLean described the album as "the record The Human League could have made if they'd remade Fleetwood Mac's Rumours in 1985" and commended the band for "mixing emotion and technology to perfection".

Controversy
The cover art of Bright Like Neon Love was closely imitated by the art for Mexican singer Thalía's album Lunada (2008). Both shared the concept of a face in close-up, wearing sunglasses and bright lipstick. Following criticism by the fans and media, Thalía claimed that the artwork had been presented to her by the design team for her label.

Track listing

Personnel
Credits adapted from the liner notes of Bright Like Neon Love.

Cut Copy
 Dan Whitford – synths, drum machine, guitars, vocals, bass
 Tim Hoey – original guitars, bass, noise
 Bennett Foddy – original bass
 Mitchell Scott – live drums

Additional musicians
 Dougal Binns – original acoustic guitar 
 Philippe Zdar, Frédo Nlandu, Julien Delfaud, Alex – claps

Technical

 Chris Scallan – full band recording
 Philippe Zdar – mixing 
 Jeff Dominguez – mixing 
 Julien Delfaud – mixing 
 Frédo Nlandu – mixing assistance
 Pierrick Devin – mixing assistance
 Mike Marsh – mastering
 Dan Whitford – production

Artwork
 Alter – artwork, design

Charts

Notes

References

2004 debut albums
Cut Copy albums
Modular Recordings albums